Herbert Joakim "Jocke" Berg (born 16 March 1970 in Eskilstuna, Sweden) is a Swedish singer, songwriter and musician, best known as the lead singer of Swedish Rock/Pop band Kent.  Berg rarely gives interviews, saying in one:  less is more.  Berg has tended to write lyrics in Swedish because he wants to avoid the use of cliché-ridden English lyrics, which often happens when Swedish artists sing in English. Kent's lyrics contributed to their development from indie band to broad mass appeal as songs in Swedish are preferred among the slightly older population that Kent has attracted, according to an academic who has studied the band in their sociological and national context.

Biography
Berg was born and grew up in Eskilstuna. He moved to Stockholm in 1993 after the founding of Kent, and has lived there since. Berg was the main songwriter, lead singer and rhythm guitarist in the band, which officially disbanded on 17 December 2016, according to the band's official web site. He is the older brother of director Adam Berg, who has directed several of Kent's music videos.

Artistic collaboration and side projects
Berg has written songs for Titiyo (most notably "Come Along", the third-most-played song by Swedish songwriters on Swedish radio during 2000–09), Lisa Miskovsky and Freddie Wadling. Besides his role in Kent, he also had a side project called Paus with The Cardigans guitarist Peter Svensson. Paus released a self-titled album in 1998. In 2012, Petra Marklund (internationally known as September) released a Swedish-language record in Sweden; Berg wrote the songs Händerna mot himlen and Sanningen, The record reached the Swedish Top 10 immediately after release.  Marklund has periodically taken the stage with Kent at concerts on the song Svart Snö. In 2015, Joakim Berg collaborated with Avicii in the song "I'll Be Gone", and debuted on Tiësto's Club Life podcast, and was the first track on December's installment of Avicii's LE7ELS podcast.

Awards
As a member of Kent, Berg has received 20 Swedish Grammy Awards. The Swedish tabloid Aftonbladet has awarded Kent with 11 Rockbjörnen awards.  In 2003, The Swedish Music Publishers Association awarded Berg for the songwriter/composer of the Year.  In 2014 H.M. King Carl XVI Gustaf of Sweden awarded Joakim Berg the H.M. The King's Medal 8th size with a bright blue ribbon for his outstanding contributions to Swedish popular music.

Discography

Kent
 Kent (1995)
 Verkligen (1996)
 Isola (1997)
 Hagnesta Hill (1999)
 B-sidor 95-00 (2000)
 Vapen & ammunition (2002)
 Du & jag döden (2005)
 The hjärta & smärta EP (2005)
 Tillbaka till samtiden (2007)
 Box 1991–2008 (2008)
 Röd (2009)
 En plats i solen (2010)
 Jag är inte rädd för mörkret (2012)
 Tigerdrottningen (2014)
 Då som nu för alltid (2016)
 Best Of (2016)

Dead People
 We Love (2022)

Solo
 Jag fortsätter glömma (2022)

Other charted songs

Side projects
 Paus (Paus) (1998)
 Titiyo (Come Along) (2001)
 Plura Jonsson (Kärlekens Tunga) (2001)
 Stakka Bo (Killer) (2001)
 Lisa Miskovsky (Fallingwater) (2003)
 Freddie Wadling (Drömmarna) (2005)
 Lisa Miskovsky (Changes) (2006)
 Downloading Nancy (Into My Arms) (2008)
 Olle Ljungström (Nåt För Dom Som Väntar) (2008)
 Bilar 2 (Det Känns Perfekt) (2011)
 Erik Hassle (Mariefred Sessions) (2011)
 Adrian Lux (All I Ever Wanted) (2012)
 Morten Harket (Lightning) (2012)
 Petra Marklund (Händerna Mot Himlen) (2012)
 Petra Marklund (Sanningen) (2012)
 Alina Devecerski (Ärligt Talat) (2012)
 Alina Devecerski (Krigar Precis Som Du ) (2012)
 Christel Alsos (Let's Pretend) (2013)
 Happiness (All Apologies) (2014)
 Frida Amundsen (Told You So) (2015)
 Ida Redig (Ghost) (2015)
 Joakim Berg & Lisa Nilsson (Innan Vi Faller) (2015)
 Avicii (I'll Be Gone) (2015)
 ADL (Forever Börjar Här) (2015)
 Petra Marklund (Ensam inte stark) (2015)
 Ellie Goulding (Lost and Found) (2015)
 Avicii (Tim) (2019)
 Smith & Thell (Hotel Walls) (2019) 
 Veronica Maggio (Fiender är tråkigt) (2019)
 Eva Dahlgren (Den jag är) (2020)
 Miriam Bryant (Lonely In A Crowd) (2021)
 Ghost (Kaisarion) (2022)
 Ghost (Respite on the Spitalfields) (2022)

References

External links

 Official website
 Official website of Kent
 kent går i graven – startar sista färden med Egoist

1970 births
Living people
Swedish songwriters
21st-century Swedish singers
21st-century Swedish male singers
People from Eskilstuna
Kent (band) members